Myrmecia infima is an Australian ant species of the genus Myrmecia. Discovered in 1900 by Forel, Myrmecia infima are frequently seen in the western regions of Australia.

Myrmecia infima are rather small bull ants. The average length of a worker is around 6-8 millimetres (which is small when compared to other Myrmecia species that grow over 40 millimetres). Males tend to be 7-8 millimetres long.

References

Myrmeciinae
Hymenoptera of Australia
Insects described in 1900
Insects of Australia